Luca Stellwagen (born 10 December 1998) is a German professional footballer who plays as a left midfielder or left-back for  club SC Verl.

References

1998 births
Living people
German footballers
Sportspeople from Ludwigshafen
Footballers from Rhineland-Palatinate
Association football midfielders
Association football fullbacks
1. FSV Mainz 05 players
SV Sandhausen players
FC Astoria Walldorf players
FC Viktoria Köln players
SC Verl players
3. Liga players
Regionalliga players